Gallikos is a river in Central Macedonia, Greece. It was known as Echedoros (Εχέδωρος) in antiquity and Gomaropnichtis (Γομαροπνίχτης) in Middle Ages. The current name probably comes from the ancient Roman colony Callicum (modern Kilkis) near the river.

It rises in the Krousia Mountain and flows into the Aegean Sea in the Thermaic Gulf, near Sindos.

References

Rivers of Greece
Landforms of Kilkis (regional unit)
Landforms of Thessaloniki (regional unit)
Rivers of Central Macedonia
Drainage basins of the Aegean Sea